The Canyon Diablo meteorite refers to the many fragments of the asteroid that created Meteor Crater (also called Barringer Crater), Arizona, United States.  Meteorites have been found around the crater rim, and are named for nearby Canyon Diablo, which lies about three to four miles west of the crater.

History
The impactor fell about 50,000 years ago. Initially known and used by pre-historic Native Americans, Canyon Diablo meteorites have been collected and studied by the scientific community since the 19th century. Meteor Crater, from the late 19th to the early 20th century, was the center of a long dispute over the origin of craters that showed little evidence of volcanism. That debate was largely settled by the early 1930s, thanks to work by Daniel M. Barringer, F.R. Moulton, Harvey Harlow Nininger, and Eugene Shoemaker.

In 1953, Clair Cameron Patterson measured ratios of the lead isotopes in samples of the meteorite. Through U-Pb radiometric dating, a refined estimate of the age of the Earth was obtained: 4.550 billion years (± 70 million years).

Composition and classification
This meteorite is an iron octahedrite (coarse octahedrite).
Minerals reported from the meteorite include:
 Cohenite – iron carbide
 Chromite – iron magnesium chromium oxide
 Daubréelite – iron(II) chromium sulfide
 Diamond and lonsdaleite – carbon
 Graphite – carbon
 Haxonite – iron nickel carbide
 Kamacite iron nickel alloy – the most common component.
 Base metal sulfides
 Schreibersite – iron nickel phosphide
 Taenite – iron nickel alloy
 Troilite – a variety of the iron sulfide mineral pyrrhotite.  The troilite in this sample is used as the standard reference for sulfur isotope ratios.
 Moissanite – a variety of silicon carbide, the second hardest natural mineral.

Samples may contain troilite-graphite nodules with metal veins and small diamonds.

Fragments
 
The biggest fragment ever found is the Holsinger Meteorite, weighing , now on display in the Meteor Crater Visitor Center on the rim of the crater. Other famous fragments:
 , Canterbury Museum, Christchurch, New Zealand. The largest fragment outside the United States.
 , Muséum national d'Histoire naturelle, Paris, France.
 , Lowell Observatory in Flagstaff, Arizona.
 226,8 kilograms (500 lb), MINES ParisTech Mineralogy Museum, Paris School of Mines, France.
 , Academy of Natural Sciences of Drexel University, Philadelphia, Pennsylvania.
 194 kilograms (427 lb), Beloit College, Beloit, Wisconsin.
 179 kilograms (395 lb), Griffith Observatory, Los Angeles, California.
 , Van Vleck Observatory, Wesleyan University, Middletown, Connecticut.
 , "Clark Iron," Meteorite Gallery, University of California, Los Angeles.
 145 kilograms (320 lb), Geology Museum, University of Wisconsin, Madison, Wisconsin.
 , Franklin Institute, Philadelphia.
 , Griffith Observatory, Los Angeles, California. Fragment loaned by the Geology Department of Pomona College.
 , California Academy of Sciences, San Francisco.
 82 kilograms (181 lb), Trinity University, San Antonio, Texas.
 , Newark Museum, Newark, New Jersey.
 46 kilograms (101 lb), Branner Library, Stanford University, Stanford, California.
 28 kilograms (57 lb), Peoria Riverfront Museum, Dome Planetarium, Peoria, Illinois.
 , Basket Meteorite, Meteor Crater Museum, Arizona.
 19 kilograms (42 lb), Wagner Free Institute of Science, Philadelphia.

See also
 Glossary of meteoritics
 δ 34S
 Reference materials for stable isotope analysis

References

External links

 Mindat.org
 NASA research note

Meteorites found in the United States
Geology of Arizona

no:Canyon Diablo